Nikolai Evgrafovich Fedoseev (May 9 1871, [O.S 27 April] Nolinsk – July 4 [O.S 22 June] 1898, Verkhoyansk) was a pioneer of Marxism in the Russian Empire .

Vladimir Lenin wrote of Fedoseev: “Fedoseev played a very important role in the Volga area and in certain parts of  Central Russia during that period; and the turn towards Marxism at that time was, undoubtedly, very largely due to the influence of this exceptionally talented and exceptionally devoted revolutionary”.

Fedoseev played the important role of acting as a teacher to Maxim Gorky and, according to historian Ralph Fox, "in some way perhaps the teacher to Lenin also". A committed earbeing Marxist being accused of embezzling party funds led to shame and a switch to an austere lifestyle that eventually led to his suicide.

References

1871 births
1898 deaths
Russian Marxists
1890s suicides

Russian revolutionaries